North Connel was a railway station located in North Connel, Argyll and Bute, on the north shore of Loch Etive. Its location was at the north end of Connel Bridge. It was on the Ballachulish branch line that linked Connel Ferry, on the main line of the Callander and Oban Railway, with Ballachulish.

History 
Although the Ballachulish Branch of the Callander and Oban Railway had opened in August 1903, this station was not opened until 7 March 1904. It comprised a single platform on the east side of the line.

The station closed in 1966 when the Ballachulish Branch was closed. The site of the station has been obliterated by the A828 trunk road having been realigned over the route of the former trackbed in 1990.

Sources 
 
 
 

Railway stations in Great Britain opened in 1904
Railway stations in Great Britain closed in 1966
Disused railway stations in Argyll and Bute
Beeching closures in Scotland
Former Caledonian Railway stations
1904 establishments in Scotland
1966 disestablishments in Scotland